is a Family Computer Disk System game. It stars the Japanese idol Risa Tachibana.

References

External links
 

1988 video games
Famicom Disk System games
Famicom Disk System-only games
Japan-exclusive video games
Konami games
Video games based on real people
Video games scored by Kiyohiro Sada
Video games developed in Japan